Heinrich Leonhard von Tschirschky und Bögendorff (15 July 1858 – 15 November 1916) was a German diplomat and politician, who served as Foreign Secretary and head of the Foreign Office from 24 January 1906 to 25 October 1907.

Early career

Born in Dresden, he was the son of Otto von Tschirschky und Bögendorff, the Director-General of the Royal Saxon State Railways, and a member of the Tschirschky noble family. He joined the German foreign service in 1883, and served from 1885 to 1886 as personal secretary to Herbert von Bismarck. He was subsequently stationed in Vienna, Athens, Bern, Constantinople and St. Petersburg, before he became Minister Resident in Luxembourg in 1900, Prussian Envoy to Mecklenburg and the Hanse city-states in 1902. He also accompanied Emperor William on travels as a representative of the Foreign Office.

Foreign Secretary

On 17 January 1906, he was appointed Secretary of State, succeeding the late Oswald von Richthofen. He served until 7 October 1907, when he was succeeded by Wilhelm von Schoen.

Ambassador in Vienna

After his term as Foreign Secretary, he was appointed Ambassador to Vienna, and served until his death there in 1916.

Orders and decorations
 : Grand Cross of St. Charles, 14 April 1907

References

External links
 

1858 births
1916 deaths
19th-century German people
Foreign Secretaries of Germany
Saxon nobility
Bohemian nobility
German people of Czech descent
Politicians from Dresden
Ambassadors of Germany to Austria
Nobility from Dresden
Grand Crosses of the Order of the Dannebrog
Grand Crosses of the Order of Saint-Charles
Knights Grand Cross of the Order of Saints Maurice and Lazarus
Commanders Grand Cross of the Order of the Polar Star